The Baltic Cross (German: Das Baltenkreuz) was a military decoration of the German Weimar Republic. It was created in 1919 by the Baltic National Committee (Baltischer Nationalausschuss), the political representation of German-Baltic population of southern Livonia and Courland (roughly equivalent to parts of modern  Latvia).

The Cross was awarded to officers, NCOs and men of the Baltic Landeswehr and voluntary groups who had fought in the Baltic states during 1918–19 for at least three months against the Bolshevik armies. Ceremonies are known from July 1919. The Baltic National Committee in Jelgava, in Courland (now in Latvia) issued numbered warrants for the award. A total of 21,839 Baltic Crosses were awarded. The Cross was accepted as a state-approved decoration of the German Reich on 16 May 1933 and was allowed to be worn. State approval was continued by the Federal Republic of Germany.

The Baltic Cross is a black oxidised metal cross superimposed with a gilt cross of the coat of arms of the Grand Master of the Teutonic Knights, ending in fleurs de lys; the reverse is plain. The ribbon is in the blue and white colours of the Baltic Landeswehr. The design was established by members of the Baltic National Committee. The Cross could be worn as a breast pin fixed on the left side of the tunic chest or from the medal ribbon. Occasionally, ribbon and plug cross were worn simultaneously. Crosses with ribbon, ring and eyelet are irregular and only intended for large orders buckle. The alternate methods of wear have given rise to descriptions that the award had two classes, but this is not true.

References

Military awards and decorations of Germany